The Merseburg University of Applied Sciences is an institution of higher education (a vocational university) located in the town of Merseburg, Germany. It was established on April 1, 1992. Its precursor was the Technical University Leuna-Merseburg (de).

External links
 www.hs-merseburg.de

Educational institutions established in 1992
Merseburg
Universities and colleges in Saxony-Anhalt
Merseburg
1992 establishments in Germany